Martin Henry "Marty" Becker (December 25, 1889 – September 25, 1957) was a  Major League Baseball center fielder who played for the New York Giants in .

External links

1889 births
1957 deaths
New York Giants (NL) players
Baseball players from Ohio
Minor league baseball managers
Kalamazoo Celery Pickers players
Kalamazoo Kazoos players
New London Planters players
Springfield Green Sox players
Springfield Hampdens players
Springfield Ponies players